

Track listing
 Latino (Santa María)
 Minitel (Santa María, John W. López)
 Tristeza (Santa María)
 I'm still a man (Santa María)
 Quand c'est l'autre qui s'en va (Santa María, John W. López, Calú)
 Echar de menos (Santa María)
 Miedo del mar (A chacun son histoire) (Santa María, John W. López)
 Same address (Santa María)
 From one sun until the next (Santa María)
 Love could kill us all (Santa María)
 No longer (Santa María)
 Perdidos (Santa María)
 Here it comes (Santa María)

1994 albums